Reign of Darkness is a 2015 release by American heavy metal band Circle II Circle. It was the band's seventh studio full-length release and their third in a row on earMUSIC.

Track listing 
 "Over-Underture" – 02:27
 "Victim of the Night" – 05:18
 "Untold Dreams" – 04:49
 "It's All Over" – 03:42
 "One More Day" – 03:48
 "Ghost of the Devil" – 03:33
 "Somewhere" – 04:35
 "Deep Within" – 04:45
 "Taken Away" – 04:08
 "Sinister Love" – 04:00
 "Solitary Rain" – 05:15

Personnel 
 Zachary Stevens – lead vocals
 Paul Michael Stewart – bass, vocals
 Christian Wentz – guitars, vocals
 Bill Hudson – guitars
 Henning Wanner – keyboards
 Marcelo Moreira – drums

Production 
 Recorded/mixed at Immaculate Production Studios in Oakland, California
 Produced by Christian Wentz
 Mixed by Ron Keeler
 Mastered by James Murphy at Safe House Production

References

External links 
 Official Circle II Circle website
 Reign of Darkness on Encyclopaedia Metallum

2015 albums
Circle II Circle albums